The Samsung Galaxy Ace 3 (GT-S7270/GT-S7272/GT-S7275R) is a smartphone manufactured by Samsung that runs the Android operating system. Announced and released by Samsung in June 2013, the Galaxy Ace 3 is the successor to the Galaxy Ace 2.

The Galaxy Ace 3 is a dual-core Android-based device, sold as an upper mid-range smartphone; the LTE model features a Qualcomm Snapdragon MSM8930 SoC, whereas the 3G model features a Broadcomm BCM21664 SoC with a 1 GHz dual-core ARM Cortex-A9 CPU and a Broadcomm VideoCore IV GPU.

Features
The Galaxy Ace 3 is a 3.5G and 4G smartphone, with quad band GSM and announced with two-band HSDPA (900/2100)MHz at 14.4(DL)/5.76(UL) Mbit/s. It sports a display of a 4.0 inch PLS TFT LCD capacitive touchscreen with 16M colours WVGA (480x800) resolution. It has a 5-megapixel camera with LED flash and auto focus, capable of recording videos at QVGA (320x240), VGA (640x480) and HD (1280x720) pixels resolution with a VGA front-facing camera. The Galaxy Ace 3 comes with a 1500 mAh (3G) and an 1800 mAh (LTE) Li-Ion battery.

The Galaxy Ace 3 has social network integration abilities and multimedia features. It is also preloaded with basic Google Apps such as Google+ and Google Messenger. The Galaxy Ace 3 is available in metallic black, white and wine red.

Successor
In August 2014, Samsung released a successor to the Galaxy Ace 3; Samsung Galaxy Ace 4.

See also
 Samsung Galaxy Ace

References 

Samsung mobile phones
Samsung Galaxy
Android (operating system) devices
Mobile phones introduced in 2013
Mobile phones with user-replaceable battery